KFIR (720 AM) is a news/talk radio station with new studios in Albany, OR 917 SE 19th Ave Albany, OR 97322 in the U.S. state of Oregon. KFIR also serves Albany, Corvallis, Lebanon, and Salem, all in the Willamette Valley. Radio Fiesta Network, LLC, owns the news and talk station.

720 AM is a United States clear-channel frequency on which there are nine radio stations in the United States, four in Mexico and none in Canada.  KOTZ in Kotzebue, Alaska and WGN in Chicago, Illinois are the dominant Class A stations.

References

External links

FIR
Sweet Home, Oregon
News and talk radio stations in the United States